Omolabake Adenle (born 1982) is a Nigerian engineer, entrepreneur and financial strategist. She is the founder and Chief Executive Officer (CEO) of  AJA.LA Studios, a company that provides digital solutions to natural African languages. Adenle invented the application software "SpeakYoruba App" which won her an award on Diversity, Equity and Inclusion (DEI) in Voice by the Women In Voice (WiN) 2021 and was shortlisted for the African Innovation Foundation's Innovation Prize for Africa (IPA) awards 2017. Omolabake Adenle holds a Ph.D. in Engineering from University of Cambridge, UK.

Early life 
Adenle was born and brought up in Lagos State, Nigeria.

Education 
Adenle studies Ph.D in Bayesian Signal Processing from Cambridge University where she was a National Science Foundation Graduate Research Fellow and Tau Beta Pi Honors Fellow.

Career 
After completing her studies, Adenle worked for Morgan Stanley as their Vice President for quantitative and derivative strategies while personally working on building African language-learning application softwares, this exposed her in the field of natural language processing for African and other low resourced languages. She then later started the AJA.LA Studios, a company that develops natural language & speech processing applications for under-resourced languages.

References 

Living people
People from Lagos
Nigerian women company founders
Nigerian women engineers
Nigerian women business executives
Alumni of the University of Cambridge
1982 births
Residents of Lagos